Victor Albert Bailey (18 December 1895 – 7 December 1964) was a British-Australian physicist. The eldest of four surviving children of William Henry Bailey, a British Army engineer, and his wife Suzana (née Lazarus), an expatriate Romanian linguist, Bailey is notable for his work in ionospheric physics and population dynamics.

Biography
Bailey read physics at The Queen's College, University of Oxford, from which he graduated with a Bachelor of Arts in 1919. Thereafter, he read for a Doctorate of Philosophy (D.Phil.) at Queen's College, under the supervision of John Sealy Edward Townsend, the Wykeham Professor of Physics and Fellow of New College, Oxford. His D.Phil. thesis was entitled "The Diffusion of Ions in Gases", and he graduated in 1923.

Bailey was employed as a demonstrator in the Electrical Laboratory at Oxford and occasional lecturer, at Queen's College, Oxford.

In 1924, he was appointed as Associate Professor of Physics at the University of Sydney. Bailey was subsequently promoted to Professor of Experimental Physics (1936–52) and Research Professor (1953–60).

Awards
 1951: T. K. Sidey Medal, awarded by the Royal Society of New Zealand for outstanding scientific research.
 1955: Fellow of the Australian Academy of Science (FAA)
 1955: Walter Burfitt Prize and A.D. Olle Award received from Royal Society of New South Wales

References

 'Bailey, Victor Albert - Ms 32', in Listing of Adolph Basser Library holdings, Australian Academy of Science, 1994, 
 'Bailey, Victor Albert', in Physics in Australia to 1945, R.W. Home, with the assistance of Paula J. Needham, Australian Science Archives Project, June 1995, 
 J. L. Hopper, "Opportunities and Handicaps of Antipodean Scientists: A. J. Nicholson and V. A. Bailey on the Balance of Animal Populations," Historical Records of Australian Science 7(2), pp. 179 – 188, 1987.

External links
 Bright Sparcs biographical entry
 Australian Dictionary of Biography entry
 List of physics publications
 Bailey's neurotree profile
 Bailey's AAS entry
 Bailey archives

Alumni of The Queen's College, Oxford
Australian people of Romanian descent
20th-century Australian physicists
British people of Romanian descent
20th-century British physicists
1895 births
1964 deaths
Fellows of the Australian Academy of Science
People from Alexandria
Academic staff of the University of Sydney